Mohammad Sidik Saimima (born 4 June 1997), is an Indonesian professional footballer who plays as a midfielder for Liga 1 club Bali United.

Club career

PSS Sleman
In 2019, Saimima signed a contract with Indonesian Liga 1 club PSS Sleman. He made his debut on 31 May 2019 in a match against Persipura Jayapura. On 13 September 2019, Saimima scored his first goal for PSS against Semen Padang in the 83rd minute at the Gelora Haji Agus Salim Stadium, Padang.

Bali United
He was signed for Bali United to play in the Liga 1 in the 2020 season. This season was suspended on 27 March 2020 due to the COVID-19 pandemic. The season was abandoned and was declared void on 20 January 2021.

Career statistics

Club

Honours

Club
Persebaya Surabaya
 Liga 2: 2017

Bali United
 Liga 1: 2021–22

References

External links
 Sidik Saimima at Soccerway
 Sidik Saimima at Liga Indonesia

1997 births
Living people
Indonesian footballers
Cilegon United players
Persegres Gresik players
Gresik United players
Persebaya Surabaya players
PSS Sleman players
Perseru Serui players
Bali United F.C. players
Liga 1 (Indonesia) players
Liga 2 (Indonesia) players
People from Tulehu
Sportspeople from Maluku (province)
Association football midfielders